Paraneoplastic acrokeratosis, or Bazex syndrome  is a cutaneous condition characterized by psoriasiform changes of hands, feet, ears, and nose, with involvement of the nails and periungual tissues being characteristic and indistinguishable from psoriatic nails. The condition is associated with carcinomas of the upper aerodigestive tract.

History
This was first reported by the French dermatologist, Andre Bazex (1911–1988), in 1945. Contrary to some publications, he did not die in 1944, as a victim of the Battle for France, but instead, was alive and well and continued his research on skin diseases up until his retirement in 1980.

See also 
 List of cutaneous conditions
 Nail anatomy
 List of cutaneous conditions associated with increased risk of nonmelanoma skin cancer

References

External links 

Conditions of the skin appendages
Syndromes